Yolanda may refer to:
 Yolanda (name), a given name derived from the Greek Iolanthe

Places 
 Yolanda, California
 Yolanda Shrine, monument located at Barangay Anibong, Tacloban, Leyte

Film 
 Yolanda (film), a 1924 film starring Marion Davies
 Yolanda and the Thief, a 1945 musical-comedy film
 Yolanda (1952 film)
 Yolanda "Honey Bunny", in the 1994 film Pulp Fiction

Music 
 Yolanda Be Cool, an Australian band

Songs 
 "Yolanda", by Bobby Blue Bland
 "Yolanda", by Pablo Milanés
 "Yolanda Hayes", by Fountains of Wayne
 "Yolanda, You Learn", by Lyle Mays and Pat Metheny

Other uses 
 Tropical Storm Yolanda, tropical cyclones named Yolanda
 Yolanda, a synonym of the orchid genus Brachionidium
 Yolanda (ship), a Cypriot cargo ship
 Yolanda, the Black Corsair's Daughter, 1905 adventure novel by Italian novelist Emilio Salgari
 Yolanda, a platforming video game for the Amiga

See also 
 Iolanthe (disambiguation)
 Jolanda
 Jolanta
 Iolanda
 Yolandi, a given name
 Yola (disambiguation)
 Yolande (disambiguation)